The Battle of Kaymakchalan was a battle that was fought between Serbian and Bulgarian troops on the Macedonian front during World War I.

The battle was fought between 12 and 30 September 1916, when the Serbian army managed to capture the peak of Prophet Elijah while pushing the Bulgarians towards the town of Mariovo, where the latter formed new defensive lines. Between 26 and 30 September, the peak changed hands several times until it was decisively captured by the Serbian army on the latter date.

The battle proved to be very costly for both sides. Serbian losses had reached around 10,000 killed and wounded by 23 September. The Bulgarian companies had been reduced to 90 men each and one regiment, the 11th Sliven Regiment, had 73 officers and 3,000 men hors de combat.

By strategic aspect, the battle was not a huge success for the Allies due to the upcoming winter that rendered further military engagements almost impossible.

Today, there is a small church on the peak of Prophet Elijah where the skulls of dead Serbian soldiers are stored, and it is regarded as a cultural site and is a tourist attraction. There is confusion about the name of the church, but it is called Saint Peter's (Sveti Petar in Serbian) which stands on the peak called Prophet Elijah.

Gallery

Notes

Sources
 
 Alan Palmer "The Gardeners of Salonika"
 
 
 http://www.serbia.com/srpski/o-srbiji/istorija/srbija-u-prvom-svetskom-ratu/osmatracnica-sa-kajmakcalana/

External links
 , The battle of Kajmakchalan, Η μάχη του Καϊμακτσαλάν

Battles of the Balkans Theatre (World War I)
Kaymakchalan
Kaymakchalan
1916 in Bulgaria
1916 in Serbia
Macedonian front
September 1916 events